He Zhongyou (born November 1965) is a Chinese politician currently serving as Communist Party Secretary of Haikou and member of the Standing Committee of the CPC Hainan Provincial Committee.

Early life and education
He was born in  Wuwei County, Anhui in November 1965. In September 1984 he was accepted to Southwest Jiaotong University, majoring in computer science.

Career
After graduating in July 1988, he was assigned to the Guangdong Provincial Communications Department, becoming its Party Branch Secretary in April 2007 and the head in March 2008. He obtained his Master of Science degree from London School of Economics at the expense of the Communist government in 1996. In 2000 he was sent to study at the University of Massachusetts Boston as a part-time student.

In December 2011 he was transferred to Heyuan and appointed Communist Party Secretary there, he concurrently served as chairman of the Standing Committee of the Municipal People's Congress in January 2012. In January 2016 he was promoted to become vice-governor of Guangdong. He was secretary of the Guangdong Provincial Politics and Law Commission in May 2017, and held that office until December 2019.

On December 5, 2019, he was appointed Communist Party Secretary of Haikou and member of the Standing Committee of the CPC Hainan Provincial Committee, replacing Zhang Qi, who was sacked for graft in September 2019.

He was a delegate to the 18th National Congress of the Communist Party of China.

References

1965 births
Living people
Southwest Jiaotong University alumni
Alumni of the London School of Economics
University of Massachusetts Boston alumni
Central Party School of the Chinese Communist Party alumni
Vice-governors of Guangdong
Political office-holders in Hainan
People's Republic of China politicians from Anhui
Chinese Communist Party politicians from Anhui